This is a list of cases that appeared before the Supreme Court of the United States involving the First Amendment to the United States Constitution.

The establishment of religion

Blue laws 

 McGowan v. Maryland (1961)
 Braunfeld v. Brown (1961)
 Gallagher v. Crown Kosher Super Market of Mass., Inc. (1961)
 Thornton v. Caldor (1985)

Government aid to church-related schools 
 Cochran v. Louisiana State Board of Education, 
 Everson v. Board of Education, 
 Board of Ed. of Central School Dist. No. 1 v. Allen, 
 Lemon v. Kurtzman, 
 Tilton v. Richardson, 
 Lemon v. Kurtzman II, 
 Levitt v. Committee for Public Education and Religious Liberty, 
 Hunt v. McNair, 
 Committee for Public Education and Religious Liberty v. Nyquist, 
 Sloan v. Lemon, 
 Wheeler v. Barrera, 
 Public Funds for Public Schools v. Marburger (1974)
 Meek v. Pittenger, 
 Roemer v. Board of Public Works of Maryland, 
 Wolman v. Walter, 
 New York v. Cathedral Academy, 
 Committee for Public Education and Religious Liberty v. Regan, 
 Mueller v. Allen, 
 School Dist. of Grand Rapids v. Ball, 
 Aguilar v. Felton, 
 Witters v. Washington Department of Services for the Blind, 
 Zobrest v. Catalina Foothills School District, 
 Board of Education of Kiryas Joel Village School District v. Grumet, 
 Agostini v. Felton, 
 Mitchell v. Helms, 
 Zelman v. Simmons-Harris, 
 Locke v. Davey, 
 Arizona Christian School Tuition Organization v. Winn,

Government-sponsored religious displays 
 Lynch v. Donnelly, 
 Board of Trustees of Scarsdale v. McCreary, 
 County of Allegheny v. American Civil Liberties Union, 
 Van Orden v. Perry, 
 McCreary County v. American Civil Liberties Union, 
 Pleasant Grove City v. Summum, 
 Salazar v. Buono, 
 American Legion v. American Humanist Association,

Legislative prayer 
 Marsh v. Chambers, 
 Town of Greece v. Galloway,

Internal religious affairs (also involving the Free Exercise Clause) 
 Watson v. Jones, 
 United States v. Ballard, 
 Kedroff v. St. Nicholas Cathedral of Russian Orthodox Church in North America, 
 Kreshik v. St. Nicholas Cathedral, 
 Presbyterian Church v. Hull Church, 
 Serbian Eastern Orthodox Diocese for the United States of America & Canada v. Milivojevich, 
 Jones v. Wolf, 
 Roman Catholic Archdiocese of San Juan v. Acevedo Feliciano,

Ministerial exception 
 Hosanna-Tabor Evangelical Lutheran Church & School v. Equal Employment Opportunity Commission, 
 Our Lady of Guadalupe School v. Morrissey-Berru,

Private religious speech 
 Lamb's Chapel v. Center Moriches Union Free School District, 
 Capitol Square Review & Advisory Board v. Pinette, 
 Rosenberger v. University of Virginia, 
 Good News Club v. Milford Central School, 
 Shurtleff v. City of Boston,

Religion in public schools 
 McCollum v. Board of Education, 
 Zorach v. Clauson, 
 Engel v. Vitale, 
 Abington School District v. Schempp, 
 Epperson v. Arkansas, 
 Stone v. Graham, 
 Wallace v. Jaffree, 
 Edwards v. Aguillard, 
 Westside Community Board of Education v. Mergens, 
 Lee v. Weisman, 
 Santa Fe Independent School District v. Doe, 
 Elk Grove Unified School District v. Newdow, 
 Kennedy v. Bremerton School District,

Religious institution functioning as a government agency 
 Larkin v. Grendel's Den, Inc., 
 Board of Education of Kiryas Joel Village School District v. Grumet,

Standing to sue 
 Flast v. Cohen, 
 Valley Forge Christian College v. Americans United for Separation of Church & State, 
 Hein v. Freedom From Religion Foundation, 
 Arizona Christian School Tuition Organization v. Winn,

Statutory religious exemptions 
 Walz v. Tax Commission of the City of New York, 
 Bob Jones University v. United States, 
 Estate of Thornton v. Caldor, Inc., 
 Corporation of Presiding Bishop of Church of Jesus Christ of Latter-day Saints v. Amos, 
 Texas Monthly, Inc. v. Bullock, 
 City of Boerne v. Flores, 
 Cutter v. Wilkinson,

Unequal government treatment of different religious groups 
 Larson v. Valente,

Abortion and contraception 
 Harris v. McRae, 
 Bowen v. Kendrick,

Other 
 Torcaso v. Watkins (1961)
 McDaniel v. Paty (1978)
 Trump v. Hawaii (2018)

The free exercise of religion

Exclusion of religion from public benefits 
 Locke v. Davey, 
 Trinity Lutheran Church of Columbia, Inc. v. Comer, 
 Espinoza v. Montana Department of Revenue, 
 Carson v. Makin,

Polygamy

 Reynolds v. United States (1878)
 Davis v. Beason (1890)

Free exercise and eminent domain 
 Lyng v. Northwest Indian Cemetery Protective Association (1988)
 City of Boerne v. Flores (1997)

Free exercise and free speech 
 R. A. V. v. City of St. Paul (1992)
 Good News Club v. Milford Central School (2001)
 Gonzales v. O Centro Espirita Beneficente Uniao do Vegetal (2006)
 Fulton v. City of Philadelphia (2021)

Free exercise and public education
 Wisconsin v. Yoder (1972)
 Widmar v. Vincent (1981)
 Board of Education of the Westside Community Schools v. Mergens (1990)
 Lamb's Chapel v. Center Moriches Union Free School District (1993)
 Rosenberger v. Rector and Visitors of the University of Virginia (1995)
 Kennedy v. Bremerton School District,

Free exercise and public property
 Capitol Square Review and Advisory Board v. Pinette (1995)

Internal religious affairs (also involving the Establishment Clause) 
 Watson v. Jones, 
 United States v. Ballard, 
 Kedroff v. St. Nicholas Cathedral of Russian Orthodox Church in North America, 
 Kreshik v. St. Nicholas Cathedral, 
 Presbyterian Church v. Hull Church, 
 Serbian Eastern Orthodox Diocese for the United States of America & Canada v. Milivojevich, 
 Jones v. Wolf, 
 Roman Catholic Archdiocese of San Juan v. Acevedo Feliciano,

Ministerial exception 
 Hosanna-Tabor Evangelical Lutheran Church & School v. Equal Employment Opportunity Commission, 
 Our Lady of Guadalupe School v. Morrissey-Berru,

Religion and the right to work
 Sherbert v. Verner (1963)
 Trans World Airlines v. Hardison (1977)
 Ohio Civil Rights Commission v. Dayton Christian Schools (1986)
 Corporation of Presiding Bishop of Church of Jesus Christ of Latter-day Saints v. Amos (1987)
 Employment Division v. Smith (1990)

Religious tests for public service or benefits
 Chaplinsky v. New Hampshire (1942)
 Torcaso v. Watkins (1961)
 McDaniel v. Paty (1978)
 Thomas v. Review Board of the Indiana Employment Security Division (1981)
 Goldman v. Weinberger (1986)
 Bowen v. Roy (1986)

Ritual sacrifice of animals 
 Church of Lukumi Babalu Aye v. City of Hialeah (1993)

Solicitation by religious groups
 Cantwell v. Connecticut (1940)
 Minersville School District v. Gobitis (1940)
 Cox v. New Hampshire (1941)
 Jones v. City of Opelika (I) (1942)
 Marsh v. Alabama (1942)
 Murdock v. Pennsylvania (1943)
 Jones v. City of Opelika (II) (1943)
 West Virginia State Board of Education v. Barnette (1943)
 Prince v. Massachusetts (1944)
 Heffron v. International Society for Krishna Consciousness (1981)
 Watchtower Society v. Village of Stratton (2002)

Statutory religious exemptions

Religious Freedom Restoration Act 

 Gonzales v. O Centro Espírita Beneficente União do Vegetal, 
 Burwell v. Hobby Lobby Stores, Inc., 
 Zubik v. Burwell, 
 Little Sisters of the Poor Saints Peter and Paul Home v. Pennsylvania, 
 Tanzin v. Tanvir,

Religious Land Use and Institutionalized Persons Act 

 Sossamon v. Texas, 
 Holt v. Hobbs, 
 Ramirez v. Collier,

Other
 Sause v. Bauer, 
 Roman Catholic Diocese of Brooklyn v. Cuomo (2020)
 Tandon v. Newsom (2021)

Freedom of speech

Campaign finance 
 Buckley v. Valeo, 
 First National Bank of Boston v. Bellotti, 
 California Medical Association v. FEC, 
 Citizens Against Rent Control v. City of Berkeley, 
 FEC v. National Right to Work Committee, 
 FEC v. National Conservative PAC, 
 FEC v. Massachusetts Citizens for Life, 
 Eu v. S.F. Cty. Democratic Cent. Comm., 
 Austin v. Michigan Chamber of Commerce, 
 Colorado Republican Federal Campaign Committee v. FEC, 
 Nixon v. Shrink Missouri Government PAC, 
 FEC v. Colorado Republican Federal Campaign Committee, 
 Republican Party of Minnesota v. White, 
 FEC v. Beaumont, 
 McConnell v. FEC, 
 Wisconsin Right to Life, Inc. v. FEC, 
 Randall v. Sorrell, 
 FEC v. Wisconsin Right to Life, Inc., 
 Davis v. FEC, 
 Citizens United v. FEC, 
 Arizona Free Enterprise Club's Freedom Club PAC v. Bennett, 
 American Tradition Partnership, Inc. v. Bullock, 
 McCutcheon v. FEC, 
 Williams-Yulee v. Florida Bar, 
 Thompson v. Hebdon, 
 FEC v. Ted Cruz for Senate,

Commercial speech 
 Valentine v. Chrestensen (1942)
 Rowan v. U.S. Post Office Dept. (1970)
 Pittsburgh Press Co. v. Pittsburgh Commission on Human Relations (1973)
 Lehman v. Shaker Heights (1974)
 Bigelow v. Commonwealth of Virginia (1974)
 Virginia State Pharmacy Board v. Virginia Citizens Consumer Council (1976)
 Bates v. State Bar of Arizona (1977)
 Linmark Associates, Inc. v. Willingboro (1977)
 Ohralik v. Ohio State Bar Assn. (1978)
 Friedman v. Rogers (1979)
 Central Hudson Gas & Electric Corp. v. Public Service Commission (1980)
 Consol. Edison Co. v. Public Serv. Comm'n (1980)
 Metromedia, Inc. v. San Diego (1981)
 Hoffman Estates v. The Flipside, Hoffman Estates, Inc. (1982)
 Bolger v. Youngs Drug Products Corp. (1983)
 Edenfield v. Fane (1993)
 44 Liquormart, Inc. v. Rhode Island (1996)
 Expressions Hair Design v. Schneiderman (2017)
 Iancu v. Brunetti (2019)

Compelled speech 
 Minersville School District v. Gobitis (1940)
 West Virginia State Board of Education v. Barnette (1943)
 Miami Herald Publishing Co. v. Tornillo (1974)
 Wooley v. Maynard (1977)
 Agency for International Development v. Alliance for Open Society (2013)
 National Institute of Family and Life Advocates v. Becerra (2018)
 Agency for International Development v. Alliance for Open Society (2020)
 303 Creative LLC v. Elenis (2023)

Compelled commercial speech
 Zauderer v. Office of Disciplinary Counsel of Supreme Court of Ohio (1985)
 Riley v. National Federation of the Blind (1988)
 Ibanez v. Florida Department of Business and Professional Regulation, Board of Accountancy (1994)
 Milavetz, Gallop & Milavetz, P.A. v. United States (2010)
 Expressions Hair Design v. Schneiderman (2017)

Compelled subsidy for speech of others

Cases that consider the First Amendment implications of payments mandated by the state going to use in part for speech by third parties

 Abood v. Detroit Board of Education (1977)
 Communications Workers of America v. Beck (1978)
 Chicago Local Teachers Union v. Hudson (1986)
 Keller v. State Bar of California (1990)
 Lehnert v. Ferris Faculty Ass'n (1991)
 Glickman v. Wileman Brothers & Elliott Inc. (1997)
 Board of Regents of the University of Wisconsin System v. Southworth (2000)
 United States v. United Foods, Inc. (2001)
 Johanns v. Livestock Marketing Association (2005)
 Davenport v. Washington Education Association (2007)
 Locke v. Karass (2008)
 Knox v. Service Employees International Union, Local 1000 (2012)
 Harris v. Quinn (2014)
 Friedrichs v. California Teachers Ass'n (2016)
 Janus v. AFSCME (2018)

Loyalty oaths and affirmations

 American Communications Association v. Douds (1950)
 Garner v. Board of Public Works (1951)
 Adler v. Board of Ed. of City of New York (1952)
 Wieman v. Updegraff (1952)
 Speiser v. Randall (1958)
 Cramp v. Board of Public Instruction (1961)
 Keyishian v. Board of Regents (1965)
 Communist Party of Indiana v. Whitcomb (1974)

Content-based
 R. A. V. v. City of St. Paul (1992)
 Reed v. Town of Gilbert (2015)
 City of Austin v. Reagan National Advertising of Austin, LLC (2022)

Content-neutral
 City of Ladue v. Gilleo (1994)

Sedition and imminent danger
 Debs v. United States (1919)
 Schenck v. United States (1919)
 Abrams v. United States (1919)
 Gitlow v. New York (1925)
 Whitney v. California (1927)
 Dennis v. United States (1951)
 Communist Party v. Subversive Activities Control Board (1955)
 Yates v. United States (1957)
 Brandenburg v. Ohio (1969)

False speech

 United States v. Alvarez (2012)
 Susan B. Anthony List v. Driehaus (2014)

Fighting words and the heckler's veto
 Cantwell v. Connecticut (1940)
 Chaplinsky v. New Hampshire (1942)
 Terminiello v. Chicago (1949)
 Feiner v. New York (1951)
 National Socialist Party of America v. Village of Skokie (1977)
 R. A. V. v. City of St. Paul (1992)
 Snyder v. Phelps (2011)

Freedom of assembly and public forums
 Hague v. CIO (1939)
 Schneider v. New Jersey (1939)
 Martin v. Struthers (1943)
 NAACP v. Alabama (1958)
 Bates v. City of Little Rock (1960)
 Edwards v. South Carolina (1963)
 Cox v. Louisiana (1965)
 Brown v. Louisiana (1966)
 Adderley v. Florida (1966)
 Carroll v. Town of Princess Anne (1968)
 Coates v. Cincinnati (1971)
 Organization for a Better Austin v. Keefe (1971)
 Southeastern Promotions, Ltd. v. Conrad (1975)
 Pruneyard Shopping Center v. Robins (1980)
 Postal Service v. Council of Greenburgh Civic Assns. (1981)
 Christian Legal Society v. Martinez (2010)
 Manhattan Community Access Corp. v. Halleck (2019)
 Americans for Prosperity Foundation v. Bonta (2021)

Time, place and manner
Cases concerning restrictions on the time, place, and manner of speech

 Chicago Police Dept. v. Mosley (1972)
 Grayned v. City of Rockford (1972)
 Ward v. Rock Against Racism (1989)
 Schenck v. Pro-Choice Network of Western New York (1997)
 Hill v. Colorado (2000)
 McCullen v. Coakley (2014)
 Minnesota Voters Alliance v. Mansky (2018)

Government speech 
Cases pertaining to whether or not extending protections to speech constitutes government endorsement of speech. 
 Pleasant Grove City v. Summum, 
 Walker v. Texas Division, Sons of Confederate Veterans (2015)
 Matal v. Tam (2017)
 Iancu v. Brunetti (2019)
 Shurtleff v. City of Boston,

Government-subsidized speech 
Cases about restrictions on speech by third parties funded by the government.

 Rust v. Sullivan (1991)
 Legal Services Corp. v. Velazquez (2001)

Obscenity

Generally

Cases concerned with the definition of obscenity and whether a particular work or type of material is obscene.

 Roth v. United States (1957)
 Alberts v. California, (1957)
 One, Inc. v. Olesen, (1958)
 MANual Enterprises v. Day, (1962)
 Jacobellis v. Ohio (1964)
 Memoirs v. Massachusetts, (1966)
 Kois v. Wisconsin (1972)
 Miller v. California (1973)
 Jenkins v. Georgia (1974)
 New York v. Ferber (1982)
 Osborne v. Ohio (1990)
 United States v. Stevens (2010)

As criminal offense
Appeals of criminal convictions for possessing, selling or distributing obscenity that focused on that issue

 Rosen v. United States (1896)
 Butler v. Michigan (1957)
 Smith v. California, (1959)
 Ginzburg v. United States, (1966)
 Mishkin v. New York, (1966)
 Redrup v. New York (1967)
 Ginsberg v. New York (1968)
 Stanley v. Georgia (1969)
 Blount v. Rizzi (1971)
 United States v. Reidel (1971)
 Heller v. New York (1973)
 United States v. Orito (1973)
 Erznoznik v. City of Jacksonville (1975)
 United States v. X-Citement Video (1994)

Search, seizure and forfeiture
Cases involving the search and seizure of allegedly obscene material

 Marcus v. Search Warrant, (1961)
 Quantity of Books v. Kansas (1964)
 Lee Art Theatre, Inc. v. Virginia (1968)
 United States v. Thirty-seven Photographs (1971)
 United States v. 12 200-ft. Reels of Film (1973)
 Roaden v. Kentucky (1973)
 Lo-Ji Sales, Inc., v. New York (1979)
 Maryland v. Macon (1985)
 New York v. P.J. Video, Inc. (1986)

Civil and administrative regulation
Cases dealing with civil and administrative regulatory procedures aimed at suppressing or restricting obscenity, such as film-licensing boards or zoning regulations.

 Mutual Film Corp. v. Industrial Commission of Ohio (1915)
 Joseph Burstyn, Inc. v. Wilson (1952)
 Kingsley Books, Inc. v. Brown (1957)
 Kingsley Int'l Pictures Corp. v. Regents of Univ. of N. Y. (1959)
 Times Film Corp. v. Chicago (1961)
 Bantam Books v. Sullivan (1963)
 Freedman v. Maryland (1965)
 Paris Adult Theatre I v. Slaton (1973)
 Young v. American Mini Theatres (1976)
 Renton v. Playtime Theatres, Inc. (1986)
 United States v. Playboy Entertainment Group (2000)

Internet
Cases involving laws meant to restrict obscenity online

 Reno v. American Civil Liberties Union (1997)
 Ashcroft v. American Civil Liberties Union (2002)
 Ashcroft v. Free Speech Coalition (2002)

Public employees 
 Pickering v. Board of Education (1968)
 Board of Regents of State Colleges v. Roth (1972)
 Perry v. Sindermann (1972)
 Arnett v. Kennedy (1974)
 Parker v. Levy (1974)
 Madison School District v. Wisconsin Employment Relations Commission (1976)
 Mt. Healthy City School District Board of Education v. Doyle (1977)
 Givhan v. Western Line Consolidated School District (1979)
 Snepp v. United States (1980)
 Connick v. Myers (1983)
 Rankin v. McPherson (1987)
 Waters v. Churchill (1994)
 United States v. National Treasury Employees Union (1995)
 Board of Commissioners, Wabaunsee County v. Umbehr, (1996)
 San Diego v. Roe (2004)
 Garcetti v. Ceballos (2007)
 Borough of Duryea v. Guarnieri (2011)
 Lane v. Franks (2014)
 Heffernan v. City of Paterson (2016)
 Houston Community College System v. Wilson,

Political activity and Hatch Act of 1939 

 Ex parte Curtis (1882)
 United Public Workers v. Mitchell (1947)
 United States Civil Service Commission v. National Association of Letter Carriers (1973)
 Broadrick v. Oklahoma (1973)
 Elrod v. Burns (1976)
 Branti v. Finkel (1979)

Public school students 
Speech by students in public secondary schools

 Tinker v. Des Moines Independent Community School District (1969)
 Healy v. James (1972)
 Board of Education v. Pico (1982)
 Bethel School District No. 403 v. Fraser (1986)
 Hazelwood School District v. Kuhlmeier (1988)
 Morse v. Frederick (2007)
 Mahanoy Area School District v. B.L. (2021)

Retaliation by public officials 
Cases in which it has been alleged governmental officials retaliated for protected speech made by private citizens who are not employed by said officials.

 Bridges v. California (1941)
 Pennekamp v. Florida (1946)
 Wood v. Georgia (1962)
 Haig v. Agee (1981)
 Gentile v. State Bar of Nevada (1991)
 Lozman v. City of Riviera Beach (2018)
 Nieves v. Bartlett (2019)

Symbolic speech
 United States v. O'Brien (1968)
 Cohen v. California (1971)
 Smith v. Goguen (1974)
 Texas v. Johnson (1989)
 United States v. Eichman (1990)
 City of Erie v. Pap's A.M. (2000)
 Virginia v. Black (2003)

Freedom of the press

Broadcast media 
 Red Lion Broadcasting Co. v. FCC (1968)
 CBS v. Democratic National Committee (1973)
 FCC v. League of Women Voters of California (1984)
 FCC v. Pacifica Foundation (1989)
 Turner Broadcasting v. FCC (1995)
 Bartnicki v. Vopper 

 FCC v. Fox Television Stations, Inc. I (2009)
 FCC v. Fox Television Stations, Inc. II (2012)

Defamation 
 Beauharnais v. Illinois (1952)
 New York Times Co. v. Sullivan (1964)
 Garrison v. Louisiana (1964)
 Curtis Publishing Co. v. Butts (1967)
 St. Amant v. Thompson (1968)
 Gertz v. Robert Welch, Inc. (1974)
 Time, Inc. v. Firestone (1976)
 Bose Corp. v. Consumers Union of United States, Inc. (1981)
 Dun & Bradstreet, Inc. v. Greenmoss Builders, Inc. (1985)
 McDonald v. Smith (1985)
 Hustler Magazine v. Falwell (1988)
 Milkovich v. Lorain Journal Co. (1990)
 Hoeper v. Air Wisconsin (2014)

Prior restraints and censorship
 Near v. Minnesota (1931)
 Lovell v. City of Griffin (1938)
 Brandenburg v. Ohio (1969)
 New York Times Co. v. United States (1971)
 Nebraska Press Assn. v. Stuart (1976)
 Houchins v. KQED, Inc. (1978)
 Tory v. Cochran (2005)
 Citizens United v. FEC (2010)

Privacy
 Time, Inc. v. Hill (1967)
 Cox Broadcasting Corp. v. Cohn (1975)
 Richmond Newspapers, Inc. v. Virginia (1980)
 Florida Star v. B. J. F. (1989)
 Wilson v. Layne (1999)

Search and seizure
 Zurcher v. Stanford Daily, (1978)

Taxation and privileges
 Grosjean v. American Press Co. (1936)
 Branzburg v. Hayes (1972)
 Minneapolis Star Tribune Company v. Commissioner (1983)

Freedom of assembly 
 United States v. Cruikshank, 
 Presser v. Illinois, 
 De Jonge v. Oregon, 
 Thomas v. Collins,

Freedom of association
 Joint Anti-Fascist Refugee Committee v. McGrath (1951)
 Watkins v. United States (1957)
 Sweezy v. New Hampshire (1957)
 NAACP v. Alabama (1958)
 Bates v. City of Little Rock (1960)
 Shelton v. Tucker (1960)
 Gibson v. Florida Legislative Investigation Committee (1963)
 Eastland v. United States Servicemen's Fund (1975)
 Abood v. Detroit Board of Education (1977) 
 In re Primus (1978)
 Roberts v. United States Jaycees (1984)
 Rotary Int'l v. Rotary Club of Duarte, 481 U.S. 537 (1987)
 Hurley v. Irish-American Gay, Lesbian, and Bisexual Group of Boston (1995)
 Boy Scouts of America v. Dale (2000)
 California Democratic Party v. Jones (2000)
 Americans for Prosperity Foundation v. Bonta,

Freedom to petition
 United States v. Cruikshank (1876)
 Thomas v. Collins (1945)
 Eastern Railroad Presidents Conference v. Noerr Motor Freight, Inc. (1961)
 NAACP v. Button (1963)
 Edwards v. South Carolina (1963)
 United Mine Workers v. Pennington (1965)
 Cox v. Louisiana (1965)
 California Motor Transport Co. v. Trucking Unlimited (1972)
 Smith v. Arkansas State Highway Employees (1979)
 McDonald v. Smith (1985)
 Meyer v. Grant (1988)
 Buckley v. American Constitutional Law Foundation (1999)
 BE and K Construction Co. V. National Labor Relations Board (2002)
 Doe v. Reed (2010)
 Borough of Duryea v. Guarnieri (2011)

Further reading
 The Oxford Companion to the Supreme Court of the United States. Kermit L. Hall, ed.
 The Oxford Guide to United States Supreme Court Decisions. Kermit L. Hall, ed.

First Amendment